David Deas (30 March 1919 – 7 December 2001) was a Scotland international rugby union player.

Rugby Union career

Amateur career

He played for Watsonians.

Provincial career

He was capped for Edinburgh District.

International career

He was capped two times for Scotland.

References

1919 births
2001 deaths
Scottish rugby union players
Scotland international rugby union players
Watsonians RFC players
Edinburgh District (rugby union) players
Rugby union number eights